Tajama Abraham Ngongba (born September 27, 1975) is a former professional basketball player in the Women's National Basketball Association.  Abraham attended George Washington University and was the 31st draft pick in the 1997 WNBA draft.  She played for Sacramento Monarchs in 1997 and Detroit Shock in 1998. Abraham took a position as the women's Assistant Coach of basketball at George Mason University in 2013.

Early years
Abraham was born September 27, 1975 on the island of St. Croix, in the United States Virgin Islands. She lived there until the age of 14 when the category 4 Hurricane Hugo hit the island on September 17 and 18, 1989. She took shelter in a commercial refrigerator, which measured 8' x 12', along with her four siblings, mother, father, and grandmother. After the destruction, the family moved to Hampton, Virginia. Not long after arriving in Virginia, local coaches and newspapers were talking about the high school basketball prospect who had arrived in town. Her father had played college ball at St. John's, and her two brothers were also basketball players who played at Marquette University and George Mason University.

High school
Abraham attended Kecoughtan High School, in Hampton, Virginia. In her senior year, she averaged 27 points per game and 11 rebounds. She earned Parade All-American (third team) status in 1993.

College career

Abraham was ranked among the top 25 players in the nation as a senior, and recruited by multiple schools, including Virginia and Old Dominion. She chose the offer from George Washington, explaining, "`I really felt at home at George Washington".

She joined the team coached by Joe McKeown who was in the fifth year of a 19-year stint at George Washington. The Colonials, under McKeown had a breakeven season in his first year, then finish second or tied for second in the Atlantic 10 conference in each of the next three years, advancing to the NCAA tournament twice. After Abraham joined the team, they finished first or tied for first in the Atlantic conference each of her four years, with an improving conference record each year culminating in a perfect 16–0 result in her senior year. The Colonials had an overall record of 28–6 in that year and reached the NCAA Elite eight. Abraham scored 2134 points in her career to graduate as the all-time leading scorer. She pulled down 970 rebounds to finish second all-time. She has the most career block shots (326) and leads in the number of games played (130). Her career accomplishments led to her induction in the George Washington Athletic Hall of Fame in 2004. In her senior season she was named the Atlantic 10 conference player of the year as well as a first-team Kodak All-American.

Professional career
After graduating from George Washington with a degree in sociology, she was selected in the 1997 WNBA draft by the Sacramento Monarchs. In 1998, the WNBA expanded and they held an expansion draft to allocate some players to the new teams. Abraham was the third pick of the expansion draft, chosen by the Detroit Shock.

Coaching career
Following her professional career, Abraham returned to her alma mater and spent a year at George Washington University as an administrative assistant. Following that she accepted a position as an assistant coach at Richmond where she stayed for the 2000–2001 and 2001–02 seasons. Abraham then moved on to Virginia Commonwealth, taking a position as an assistant coach which included responsibilities for conditioning, scouting, post play development, and recruiting. She held this position for two seasons, starting in the fall of 2002.

She then returned to George Washington again, and served as an assistant coach for the next four years.

In 2004, Radford University named Abraham to head coaching position of the women's basketball team. She remained at Radford for five years. In her third year, the team 111 conference games the most in almost 2 decades, leading to a tie for second place in the Big South conference and earning Abraham Big South coach of the year honors. She was completely surprised by the honor and reflected, "I'm a high-energy person. It took every fiber of my being just to keep from jumping up and down."

Over the next two years, the team managed to go only .500 in conference play, and the school decided not to renew her contract now at the end of a five-year period. She decided to return to the assistant coaching ranks, accepting an offer from Nyla Milleson at George Mason.

Career statistics

College

Sources

WNBA

Source

Regular season

|-
| align="left" | 1997
| align="left" | Sacramento
| style="background:#D3D3D3"| 28° || 5 || 15.1 || .381 || – || .684 || 2.4 || .5 || .4 || .4 || 1.8 || 4.4
|-
| align="left" | 1998
| align="left" | Detroit
| 12 || 0 || 3.7 || .357 || – || .533 || .6 || .0 || .2 || .1 || .4 || 1.5
|-
| align="left" | Career
| align="left" | 2 years, 2 teams
| 40 || 5 || 11.7 || .379 || – || .642 || 1.9 || .3 || .4 || .3 || 1.4 || 3.5

Head coaching record
Sources

References

External links
 Tajama Abraham Ngongba's profile from the official George Washington University athletics website

1975 births
Living people
All-American college women's basketball players
American women's basketball coaches
American women's basketball players
Detroit Shock players
George Mason Patriots women's basketball coaches
George Washington Colonials women's basketball players
People from Saint Croix, U.S. Virgin Islands
Radford Highlanders women's basketball coaches
Sacramento Monarchs players
Sportspeople from Hampton, Virginia
United States Virgin Islands women's basketball players